Trimusculus is a genus of medium-sized air-breathing sea snails or false limpets, marine pulmonate gastropod molluscs in the family Trimusculidae.

Trimusculus is the only genus in the family Trimusculidae. Trimusculidae, the button snails, is the only family in the superfamily Trimusculoidea, a superfamily of false limpets. These are marine pulmonate gastropod mollusks in the clade Eupulmonata.

Trimusculids are not very closely related to the siphonariids, another family of marine air-breathing false-limpets. The trimusculids are in the clade Eupulmonata, and are quite closely related to air-breathing land snails.

Description
Trimusculids are sometimes known as "button shells" or "button snails" because, especially in the eastern Pacific species Trimusculus reticulatus, the shells are small, white, almost perfectly circular in outline, only moderately elevated, and thus the shells are somewhat reminiscent of traditional white shirt buttons.

Species
Species within the genus Trimusculus include:

 Trimusculus afer (Gmelin, 1791)
 Trimusculus carinatus (Dall, 1870)
 Trimusculus conicus (Angas, 1867) - synonym: Gadinalea conica (Angas, 1867)
 Trimusculus costatus (Krauss, 1848)
 Trimusculus escondidus Poppe & Groh, 2009
 Trimusculus goesi (Hubendick, 1946)
 Trimusculus kurodai Habe, 1958
 Trimusculus mammillaris (Linnaeus, 1758)
 Trimusculus mauritianus (Martens, 1880)
 Trimusculus niveus (Hutton, 1883) - synonym: Gadinalea nivea Hutton, 1883
 Trimusculus odhneri (Hubendick, 1946)
 Trimusculus peruvianus (Sowerby II, 1835)
 Trimusculus reticulatus (Sowerby II, 1835)
 Trimusculus stellatus (Sowerby II, 1835)
 Trimusculus yamamotoi Habe, 1958
Synonyms
 Trimusculus mammilaris [sic]: synonym of Trimusculus mammillaris (Linnaeus, 1758) (misspelling of mammillaris (Linnaeus, 1758))
 Trimusculus niveus (Hutton, 1878): synonym of Trimusculus conicus (Angas, 1867)
 Trimusculus semicorneus (Preston, 1908): synonym of Acmaea semicornea Preston, 1908: synonym of Discradisca semicornea (Preston, 1908)

References

 Poppe G. & Groh K. (2009) A new species of Trimusculus (Gastropoda: Eupulmonata: Trimusculidae) from the Central Philippines. Visaya 2(5): 91-93
 Dayrat, B., Conrad, M., Balayan, S., White, T. R., Albrecht, C., Golding, R., Gomes, S. R., Harasewych, M. G., & Frias Martins, A. M. de. (2011). Phylogenetic relationships and evolution of pulmonate gastropods (Mollusca): new insights from increased taxon sampling. Molecular Phylogenetics and Evolution 59: 425-437.

External links
 Schmidt F.C. 1818, Versuch über die beste Einrichtung zur Aufstellung: Behandlung und Aufbewahrung der verschiedenen Naturkörper und gegenṣtände der Kunst, vorzüglich der Conchylien-Sammlungen, nebst kurzer Beurtheilung der conchyliologischen Systeme und Schriften und einer tabellarischen Zusammenstellung und Vergleichung der sechs besten und neuesten conchyliologischen Systeme. Gotha, J. Perth, 252 pp.
 Gray, J. E. (1824). Zoological notices. On the characters of zoophytes. On Gadinia, a new genus of patelloid shells. On some new species of Ampullariadae (Marisa and Bithinia). The Philosophical Magazine and Journal. 63 (312): 274-277
 Sowerby, G. B. I. (1835). Characters of and observations on new genera and species of Mollusca and Conchifera collected by Mr. Cuming. Proceedings of the Zoological Society of London. 3(25): 4-7; 3(26): 21-23; 3(27): 41-43; 46-47; 3(28): 49-51; 3(30): 84-85; 3(30): 93-96; 3(31): 109-110
 redale, T. (1940). Marine Molluscs from Lord Howe Island, Norfolk Island, Australia, and New Caledonia. Australian Zoologist. 9: 429-443
 Rehder, H. A. (1940). On the molluscan genus Trimusculus Schmidt 1818, with notes on some Mediterranean and West African Siphonarias. Proceedings of The Biological Society of Washington. 53: 67-69

Trimusculidae
Gastropods described in 1818